The 2009 Legg Mason Tennis Classic (also known as the 2009 Legg Mason Tennis Classic presented by GEICO for sponsorship reasons) was a men's tennis tournament played on outdoor hard courts. It was the 41st edition of the event known that year as Legg Mason Tennis Classic, and was part of the ATP World Tour 500 series of the 2009 ATP World Tour. It took place at the William H.G. FitzGerald Tennis Center in Washington, D.C., United States, from August 1 through August 9, 2009. The Legg Mason Tennis Classic was the third ATP stop of the 2009 US Open Series. Unlike previous years, the men's event was field 48 players instead of 32. Second-seeded Juan Martín del Potro won the singles title.

Finals

Singles

 Juan Martín del Potro defeated  Andy Roddick, 3–6, 7–5, 7–6(8–6).
 It was del Potro's second title of the year and sixth of his career.
 It was his second consecutive title at the event.

Doubles

 Martin Damm /  Robert Lindstedt defeated
 Mariusz Fyrstenberg /  Marcin Matkowski, 7–5, 7–6(7–3).

ATP entrants
List of Association of Tennis Professionals (ATP) singles entrants, as of July 27, 2009.

Seeds

Other entrants
The following players received wildcards into the singles main draw

  Jerzy Janowicz
  Donald Young
  Michael Russell

The following players received entry from the qualifying draw:
  Somdev Devvarman
  Alejandro Falla
  Santiago Giraldo
  Yūichi Sugita
  Jesse Witten
  Sébastien de Chaunac

The following player received the lucky loser spot:
  Nicolás Lapentti

Notes

 ATP rankings, as of Monday, July 27, 2009.
 Seedings based on the Monday, July 27, 2009 ATP rankings.

References

External links
Official website

Photos:
2009 Legg Mason Tennis Classic - Photo Gallery

 
Legg Mason Tennis Classic
Legg Mason Tennis Classic
2009
2009 in sports in Washington, D.C.